Jenthe Mertens (born 18 October 1999) is a Belgian professional footballer who plays for Belgian First Division A side Beveren.

Career
Mertens made his professional debut for OH Leuven on 5 August 2017 in the home match against Lierse.

Go Ahead Eagles
On 2 September 2019 it was confirmed, that Mertens had joined Go Ahead Eagles on a contract until the summer 2020 with an option for one further year.

References

External links
 
 

1999 births
Living people
Belgian footballers
Belgian expatriate footballers
Association football defenders
Oud-Heverlee Leuven players
Go Ahead Eagles players
S.K. Beveren players
Belgian Pro League players
Challenger Pro League players
Eerste Divisie players
Belgian expatriate sportspeople in the Netherlands
Expatriate footballers in the Netherlands
Sportspeople from Genk
Footballers from Limburg (Belgium)